Mustang Creek is a stream primarily located in Johnson County, with a section in Hill County in Texas. 

The stream rises six miles east of Cleburne and flows southwest for fourteen miles before meeting the Nolan River near Blum.

See also 

 List of rivers of Texas
Mustang Creek (Tarrant County)

References 

Rivers of Texas
Johnson County, Texas
Hill County, Texas